Albania's transition from a socialist centrally planned economy to a capitalist mixed economy has been largely successful. "Formal non-agricultural employment in the private sector more than doubled between 1999 and 2013," notes the World Bank, with much of this expansion powered by foreign investment.

For further information on the types of business entities in this country and their abbreviations, see Business entities in Albania.

Notable companies 
This list includes notable companies with primary headquarters located in the country. The industry and sector follow the Industry Classification Benchmark taxonomy. Organizations which have ceased operations are included and noted as defunct.

See also 
 :Category:Albanian brands
 List of airlines of Albania
 List of banks in Albania
 List of supermarket chains in Albania

References 

 
Albania